Sunni Tehreek is a Pakistani Barlevi organization. The organization was founded by Muhammad Saleem Qadri in 1990 in order to prevent Barelevi mosques from being seized by Deobandi and Wahabi organizations.  It also sees itself as a defender of Barelvis from attacks from Deobandis and Wahabi Muslims.

The Islamist group is known for its strong support of Pakistan's controversial blasphemy laws, and for its hardline support of the death penalty for those accused of committing blasphemy. Sunni Tehreek is vocal in its support of Mumtaz Qadri, the bodyguard who murdered Punjab's governor Salman Taseer after Taseer called for reform of blasphemy laws. Supporters of the organization assaulted the popular former pop-star Junaid Jamshed, and called for his prosecution under the blasphemy laws.

History
After the fragmenting and decline of the Muttahida Qaumi Movement, Pakistan Sunni Tehreek arose as the primary opposition to the Deobandi-Wahabi Banuri Mosque, headed by Nizamuddin Shamzai.  The Pakistan Sunni Tehreek strongly opposed the giving of important religious posts to Deobandis. Its branch in Lahore publicly declared its opposition to the appointment of a Deobandi cleric as khateeb of Badshahi Mosque, and other similar appointments.

Split into PST and ST 
Due to internal disputes, Sunni Tehreek later splits up into two main factions. Sarwat Ejaz Qadri, one of its main leader formed a much larger faction which was later named as Pakistan Sunni Tehreek (PST) 
while Ahmed Bilal Qadri (son of ST's founder Saleem Qadri) formed his own faction and his faction adapted its same old name.

Controversies
In May 2001, sectarian riots broke out after Sunni Tehreek leader Saleem Qadri was assassinated by Sipah-e-Sahaba Pakistan, an anti-Shiite Deobandi militant and terrorist group. His successor, Abbas Qadri, charged President Asif Ali Zardari with "patronising terrorists" and "standing between us and the murderers."

In April 2007, alleged Sunni Tehreek members opened gunfire on an Ahl-i Hadith mosque in Karachi.  One worshiper was killed in the attack. After the attack, Western analysts described the movement as a radicalization of traditional beliefs in the Indian subcontinent.

References

External links
Official Website of Sunni Tehreek

Islamic political parties in Pakistan
Barelvi organizations
Sunni organizations
Militant Sufi organisations
Islamic organisations based in Pakistan
Barelvi political parties